This is a list of computer software and information technologies that are in the Fortune 500 list of the largest U.S. companies by revenue in the year of 2020.

References

External links
Fortune 500, 2020

Fortune (magazine)
Top lists